Malcolm Dole (March 4, 1903 – November 29, 1990) was an American chemist known for the Dole Effect in which he proved that the atomic weight of oxygen in air is greater than that of oxygen in water and for his work on electrospray ionization, polymer chemistry, and electrochemistry.

Dole effect
The Dole effect is the inequality in the ratio of heavy oxygen isotope 18O to the more abundant 16O in the earth's atmosphere and in seawater. 
This effect was reported by Dole in 1935.  The effect is due to slightly different reaction rates for the two isotopes in respiration in plants and in animals which tends to retain the lighter 16O, which increases the relative concentration of 18O in the atmosphere.

Electrospray
Electrospray is a process in which a high voltage is applied to a liquid to create an aerosol containing highly charged droplets. Dole in 1968 was the first to use electrospray ionization with mass spectrometry.

Books

References

1903 births
1990 deaths
American physical chemists
Baylor University faculty
Harvard University alumni
Mass spectrometrists
Northwestern University faculty
Fellows of the American Physical Society